Karviná District is a district (okres) within the Moravian-Silesian Region of the Czech Republic. Its administrative center is the city of Karviná. It was created by 1960 reform of administrative divisions in the area of former Fryštát District. Karviná District is part of Czech Silesia.

The Karviná District is facing a fast population decline. The population decreased between 2010 and 2019. In 2019, there was 23,445 people (8.6%).

Complete list of municipalities
Albrechtice – 
Bohumín – 
Český Těšín – 
Chotěbuz – 
Dětmarovice – 
Dolní Lutyně – 
Doubrava – 
Havířov – 
Horní Bludovice – 
Horní Suchá – 
Karviná – 
Orlová – 
Petrovice u Karviné – 
Petřvald – 
Rychvald – 
Stonava – 
Těrlicko

References

External links
 List of municipalities of Karviná District 

 
Districts of the Czech Republic